

Domar, Duoma or  Duomaxiang is a village and township-level division of Shuanghu County in the Nagqu Prefecture of the Tibet Autonomous Region, in China. As of 2004 it had a population of 1,488 people.

The principal economic activity is animal husbandry, with pastoral yak, goat and sheep. The township is very rich in fish and mineral resources, and as many as 30 kinds of mineral which are found there, including coal, iron, chromium, iron, copper, zinc, antimony, molybdenum, gold dust, rock gold, borax, platinum, silver, rock crystal, jade, mica, salt, oil, etc.

Administrative divisions
The township-level division contains the following villages:

Zhongluma Village (仲鲁玛村) 	
Guogen Caqu Village	(果根擦曲村)
Sanawo Village	(萨那沃村) 	
Lajia Luma Village (拉加鲁玛村)
Gakama Village (嘠喀玛村)

See also
List of towns and villages in Tibet

References

External links
 Domar Township, OpenStreetMap, retrieved 21 July 2022

Township-level divisions of Tibet
Populated places in Nagqu